Arouna Koné (born 11 November 1983) is an Ivorian professional footballer who plays as a striker for Belgian club VK Weerde.

After making a name for himself in the Eredivisie, with Roda JC and PSV, he signed with Sevilla in 2007, where he rarely appeared due to injury and loans. In 2012, he moved from Levante to the Premier League, where he represented Wigan Athletic and Everton, winning one FA Cup with the former.

Koné played internationally for the Ivory Coast national team from his debut in 2004 until retirement in 2013. He appeared at the 2006 FIFA World Cup, as well as three Africa Cup of Nations tournaments for his country, earning a total of 39 caps and scoring 9 goals.

Club career

PSV
Koné endured a difficult start to PSV's 2007–08 season: due to a date mix-up, he returned late to pre-season training following a holiday in his country, thus missing out on valuable time to prepare for the new campaign. Added to this, the player was struck down with malaria at the end of July 2007, In August, it was announced that he had returned to training following his health scare, and was expected to be fit in time for the team's first league game against Heracles Almelo on the 19 July; he also immediately returned to international duty.

Sevilla
On 30 August 2007, after reported interest from English Premier League side Middlesbrough, Sevilla signed Koné on a five-year deal for a reported €12 million transfer fee. He made his Liga debut on 16 September as a second-half substitute for Frédéric Kanouté in a 4–1 win against Recreativo de Huelva – he won a penalty in the game, but fellow striker Aleksandr Kerzhakov failed to convert. Nine days later, he scored his first goal for the Spaniards, helping the team come from behind 0–2 against Espanyol to tie it 2–2 in an eventual 2–3 home loss. On 2 October, he netted his first UEFA Champions League goal for the club in a 4–2 group stage win against Slavia Prague after just ten minutes on the pitch.

In April 2008, it was reported that Koné was to be shown the door at Sevilla in the summer of 2008 after a disappointing first season. His lack of playing time, partly due to the form of strikers Luís Fabiano and Kanouté, and an argument on the training ground with a member of the training staff that was caught on Spanish television, made for some intense speculation about the player's future. In the run-up to the 2008–09 campaign, he suffered a serious injury while playing for the Ivory Coast against Guinea on 20 August, and a subsequent scan showed he had suffered a cruciate knee ligament injury in his left leg. He underwent surgery to repair the damage the following week, returning to training in February 2009.

Koné subsequently fell out of favour at Sevilla and, after much transfer speculation, in February 2010 he joined Bundesliga club Hannover 96 on loan until the end of the season.

Koné only appeared once for Sevilla in 2010–11, playing one minute against Villarreal. For the following season, he was loaned to Levante, starting often and scoring his first goal of the campaign on 18 September 2011 in a surprise 1–0 home win over Real Madrid.

Koné was rested for the final three games of the season due to a minor injury, and also because he was "scoring too many goals", as if he reached 18 he would have to return to Sevilla automatically, something he did not desire. Instead, he moved to Levante on a permanent basis, though the club were reported to be keen to sell him immediately for a profit.

Wigan Athletic
On 14 August 2012, Koné signed a three-year contract with English side Wigan Athletic, for a reported fee of €3.5 million. Wigan beat off competition from a number of other English clubs, with the striker being persuaded to sign due to the team's passing style of play. He scored his first league goal in his second match and his first start, an 89th-minute strike against Southampton for the final goal in a 0–2 away win. He netted a brace in a 4–1 defeat of Huddersfield Town in the fifth round of the FA Cup on 17 February 2013, and added another two in his side's next match, a 0–3 league win over Reading.

Koné won the FA Cup with the ''Latics'', featuring the full 90 minutes in a 1–0 upset against Manchester City. Only three days later, however, Wigan were relegated from the top division following a 4–1 defeat against Arsenal.

Everton
On 8 July 2013, Everton confirmed the signing of Koné on a three-year deal for an undisclosed fee. He made his debut on 17 August, coming on as an 81st-minute substitute in a 2–2 draw against Norwich City. In October, he suffered a knee cartilage injury and did not play again for the rest of the season. Returning on 24 December 2014, he netted his first goal for Everton against Newcastle United in the early stages of a 3–2 defeat. On the opening day of the 2015–16 Premier League season, Koné came off the bench to assist and score to help Everton secure a 2–2 draw against Watford. His performance was rewarded with a start away to Southampton, in a 0–3 win in which the Ivorian recorded an assist. Koné then continued his impressive start to the season, excelling in Everton's 3–1 win over Chelsea. He scored his first Everton hat-trick in their 6–2 victory over Sunderland on 1 November 2015. Kone was released by Everton at the end of the 2016–17 season.

Sivasspor
Koné signed a two-year contract with Turkish Süper Lig club Sivasspor on 4 July 2017. He made his first appearance for the team on 12 August against Akhisarspor, who were defeated 1–0 in the first matchday. He scored his first goal for the team against Yeni Malatyaspor, who they faced in the second round of the league on 19 August; a match they won 2–0. On 5 November 2017, he scored two goals against Konyaspor, securing a 2–1 win for his team. Koné scored 13 goals in the 2017–18 season, and scored another 11 goals in the 2018–19 season, becoming the team's top scorer.

International career

Koné played for the Mama Ouattara-led Ivory Coast under-20 team in the 2003 FIFA World Youth Championship, where he starred alongside Lierse teammate Adolphe Tohoua. He scored three goals in the tournament – once against Mexico in a 2–1 win, and twice in the 2–2 draw against the Republic of Ireland – in an eventual round-of-16 exit, and the official FIFA website declared him to be a "crucial pivot for the attacking thrust" of the Ivorian team, and described him as a player possessing "physical strength, aerial ability and good ball control".

Koné was also picked for the squad that appeared at the 2006 FIFA World Cup in Germany, a first-ever for the African nation. He replaced Abdul Kader Keïta in the 77th minute of the first game, a 1–2 loss against Argentina, and started in the other two – going scoreless in the process – as the national team did not make it to the knockout stages.

After spending four years in the international wilderness due to injuries and loss of form, Koné was recalled to the Ivorian squad in 2012 and was named in the squad for the 2013 African Cup of Nations due to his club form at Wigan, with boss Roberto Martínez commenting on his player's international return, "Arouna had a long period when he wasn't involved with the national team, and that was hard because he loves representing his country. When he is happy, we are happy, and I am very pleased he is back in the Ivory Coast squad."

Personal life
Koné is married and has two sons and three daughters. He is a Muslim, and his father died when he was nine years old.

Koné attributes his peroxide blonde hair to former basketball player Dennis Rodman, and states that his footballing heroes were Liberian legend George Weah and Brazilian superstar Ronaldo.

Career statistics

Club

International goals
Scores and results list Ivory Coast's goal tally first.

Honours
PSV
Eredivisie: 2005–06, 2006–07

Wigan Athletic
FA Cup: 2012–13

Sivasspor
Turkish Cup: 2021–22

International
Ivory Coast
Africa Cup of Nations runner-up:2006

References

External links

 Stats at Voetbal International 
 
 
 
 

1983 births
Living people
Footballers from Abidjan
Ivorian footballers
Association football forwards
Belgian Pro League players
Lierse S.K. players
Eredivisie players
Roda JC Kerkrade players
PSV Eindhoven players
La Liga players
Sevilla FC players
Levante UD footballers
Bundesliga players
Hannover 96 players
Premier League players
Wigan Athletic F.C. players
Everton F.C. players
Süper Lig players
Sivasspor footballers
Ivory Coast international footballers
2006 FIFA World Cup players
2006 Africa Cup of Nations players
2008 Africa Cup of Nations players
2013 Africa Cup of Nations players
Ivorian expatriate footballers
Expatriate footballers in Belgium
Expatriate footballers in the Netherlands
Expatriate footballers in Spain
Expatriate footballers in Germany
Expatriate footballers in England
Expatriate footballers in Turkey
Ivory Coast under-20 international footballers
Ivorian Muslims
FA Cup Final players